El Chadaille Bitshiabu (born 16 May 2005) is a French professional footballer who plays as a centre-back for Ligue 1 club Paris Saint-Germain.

Club career
Bitshiabu is a former youth player of US Saint-Denis and Boulogne-Billancourt. He joined the Paris Saint-Germain Academy in 2017. He caught attention of the media during a friendly tournament later that year due to his exceptional height at that age.

On 27 July 2020, Bitshiabu signed a three-year aspiring contract with Paris Saint-Germain. He made his first appearance for the senior team the following week on 5 August, in a 1–0 friendly win over Sochaux. On 29 July 2021, Bitshiabu signed his first professional contract, tying him to the club until June 2024. He made his debut for the club in a 3–0 Coupe de France win over Feignies Aulnoye on 19 December 2021. His debut at the age of 16 years and 213 days made him the youngest player to appear in an official match for the club, a record which was previously held by Kingsley Coman. On 20 April 2022, he made his Ligue 1 debut as a substitute in a 3–0 away win over Angers.

On 28 December 2022, Bitshiabu made his first Ligue 1 start for PSG in a 2–1 home win over Strasbourg, playing as a left-back to fill in for the late withdrawal of Juan Bernat due to injury. After the match, manager Christophe Galtier hailed Bitshiabu's performance as "very good". On 8 March 2023, he made his UEFA Champions League debut in a 2–0 defeat against Bayern Munich in the round of 16 second leg, replacing the injured Nordi Mukiele at half-time.

International career
Bitshiabu is a French youth international. He started to receive call-ups to French youth teams in January 2020. In 2021, Bitshiabu was called up to play for the France under-18s for the Tournoi International de Limoges.

Personal life
Born in France, Bitshiabu is of DR Congolese descent.

Career statistics

Honours
Paris Saint-Germain
Ligue 1: 2021–22

France U17
UEFA European Under-17 Championship: 2022

References

External links
 
 
 

2005 births
Living people
Sportspeople from Villeneuve-Saint-Georges
Footballers from Val-de-Marne
French footballers
France youth international footballers
French sportspeople of Democratic Republic of the Congo descent
Black French sportspeople
Association football defenders
Paris Saint-Germain F.C. players
Championnat National 3 players
Ligue 1 players